The 1924 UCI Track Cycling World Championships were the World Championship for track cycling. They took place in Paris, France from 3 to 10 August 1924. Three events for men were contested, two for professionals and one for amateurs.

Medal summary

Medal table

See also
 1924 UCI Road World Championships

References

Track cycling
UCI Track Cycling World Championships by year
International cycle races hosted by France
Uci
1924 in track cycling